Miklós Micsinai (born 11 January 1998) is a Hungarian professional footballer who plays for Szeged-Csanád.

Club career
On 24 June 2022, Micsinai joined Szeged-Csanád.

Career statistics
.

References

External links

1998 births
People from Kecskemét
Sportspeople from Bács-Kiskun County
Living people
Hungarian footballers
Association football midfielders
BFC Siófok players
Kazincbarcikai SC footballers
Budafoki LC footballers
Szeged-Csanád Grosics Akadémia footballers
Nemzeti Bajnokság I players
Nemzeti Bajnokság II players